Andrew Noble may refer to:

Sir Andrew Noble, 1st Baronet (1831–1915), Scottish physicist
Andrew Noble (skier) (born 1984), alpine skier for Great Britain
Sir Andrew Noble, 2nd Baronet (1904–1987); see Noble baronets
Andrew Noble (diplomat), British diplomat